Earvin is a given name.  Notable people with the name include:
Earvin "Magic" Johnson (born 1959), American executive and former basketball player
Earvin "EJ" Johnson (born 1992), son of Magic; American television personality
Earvin N'Gapeth (born 1991), French volleyball player

See also
 Ervin (disambiguation)
 Ervine
 Erving (disambiguation)
 Erwan
 Erwin (disambiguation)
 Irvin
 Irvine (disambiguation)
 Irving (disambiguation)
 Irwin (disambiguation)